Dmitry Sergeyevich Abanin (born 31 December 1980 in Moscow, USSR) is a Russian curler.

At the international level he is a 2006 European Mixed Curling Championship bronze medallist.

At the national level he is a three-time Russian men's champion curler (2005, 2006, 2008) and a 2007 Russian mixed doubles champion curler.

Awards
 Russian Men's Curling Championship: gold (2005, 2006, 2008), bronze (2014, 2019).
 European Mixed Curling Championship: bronze (2006).
 Master of Sports of Russia, International Class (curling, 2006).

Teams

Men's

Mixed

Mixed doubles

References

External links

Living people
1980 births
Curlers from Moscow
Russian male curlers
Russian curling champions